St John's Church, Colston Bassett is an English parish church of the Church of England in Colston Bassett, Nottinghamshire. It is Grade II listed by the Department for Digital, Culture, Media and Sport as a building of special architectural or historic interest.

History
St John's Church, Colston Bassett, was built in 1892 by the architect Arthur Brewill at the behest of Robert Millington Knowles of Colston Bassett Hall, High Sheriff of Nottinghamshire. However, the work was of poor quality and the church soon needed restoration. This was begun in 1934 by Charles Marriott Oldrid Scott, and the building reopened by the Bishop of Southwell, the Henry Mosley on 12 August 1936, while instituting a new vicar, the Rev. John Booth.

St John's replaced an earlier parish church dedicated to St Mary, which had become ruined and was further from the village. Substantial remains of it can still be seen and are listed Grade 1 in the List of Buildings of Special Architectural or Historical Interest. They date from the Anglo-Saxon, Norman, Gothic (the building's greatest size was reached in 1470), and Georgian periods. The churchyard remains in use.

Current parish status
St John's Church, Colston Bassett is in the Wiverton group of parishes, which also includes:
St Andrew's Church, Langar
St Giles's Church, Cropwell Bishop
All Saints' Church, Granby
Holy Trinity Church, Tythby
St Mary's Church, Barnstone (no longer in use)
St Michael and All Angels' Church, Elton on the Hill

Old Rectory
The Old Rectory dates from 1834 and was designed by Henry Moses Wood.

Sources

Church of England church buildings in Nottinghamshire
Grade II listed churches in Nottinghamshire
Diocese of Southwell and Nottingham
Churches completed in 1892
19th-century Church of England church buildings
Basil Baily